The 2018 European U23 Wrestling Championship was the 4th edition of European U23 Wrestling Championships of combined events, and took place from June 4 to 10 in Istanbul, Turkey.

Medal table

Team ranking

Medal summary

Men's freestyle

Men's Greco-Roman

Women's freestyle

References

External links 
 Wrestling Database
 Results

European Wrestling U23 Championships
European Wrestling U23 Championships
Sports competitions in Istanbul
European U23 Wrestling Championship